FK Loko Vltavín is a Czech football club located in Holešovice, Prague. It currently plays in the Bohemian Football League, which is the third tier of the Czech football system.

History
The club played in the Czech Fourth Division for six seasons between 2003 and 2009 until winning group A in June 2009. At the same time, the club's B team was promoted from the I.A class to the Prague Championship. In 2013, they won the Bohemian Football League. The club played in the 2013–14 Czech National Football League, scoring their first-ever goal in the competition in a 1–0 victory against Vlašim in August 2013. The club found themselves ten points away from safety with four matches of the season remaining. Their relegation was confirmed in May 2014 after a 2–1 loss to FK Baník Sokolov.

Honours
Bohemian Football League (third tier)
 Champions: 2012–13

References

External links
  
 Loko Vltavín at the website of the Prague Football Association 

Football clubs in the Czech Republic
Association football clubs established in 1898
Football clubs in Prague
Prague 7